Joseph or Joe Evans may refer to:
 Joseph Evans (politician) (1837–1904), English-born Australian politician
 Joseph Evans, the legal name of hip hop musician Sev Statik
 Joseph P. Evans (1835–1889), American politician in Virginia
 Joseph Edward Evans (1855–1938), British schoolmaster and amateur astronomer
 Joe Evans (1895–1951), professional baseball player 
 Joe Evans (footballer) (1920–2013), Australian rules footballer
 Joe Evans (musician) (1916–2014), jazz alto saxophonist
 Joseph Evans (war correspondent), see New York Herald Tribune
 Joseph Evans (footballer) (1906–1971), English footballer